1993 was the second season Russia held its own national football competition since the breakup of the Soviet Union.

Club competitions

FC Spartak Moscow won the league for the second time in a row.

For more details, see:
1993 Russian Top League
1993 Russian First League
1993 Russian Second League

Cup competitions
The first ever edition of the Russian Cup, 1992–93 Russian Cup was won by FC Torpedo Moscow, who beat PFC CSKA Moscow in the finals in a shootout 5-3 after finishing extra time at 1-1.

Early stages of the 1993–94 Russian Cup were played later in the year.

European club competitions

1992–93 UEFA Champions League
PFC CSKA Moscow continued their group campaign and finished it without much success, only gaining 2 points in 6 games, coming in last in the group and suffering a 0-6 defeat against Marseille. They could not play their home games in Moscow due to the lack of a stadium meeting the Champions League standards at the time.

 March 3, 1993 / Group A, Day 3 / PFC CSKA Moscow - Marseille (France) 1-1 (Faizulin  - Pelé ) / Berlin, Olympic Stadium / Attendance: 10,000
PFC CSKA Moscow: Plotnikov, Mamchur, Kolotovkin (captain), Bystrov, Malyukov, Antonovich, Minko (Karsakov, 55), Ivanov (Dudnyk, 46), Sergeyev, Bushmanov, Faizulin.

 March 17, 1993 / Group A, Day 4 / Marseille - PFC CSKA Moscow 6-0 (Sauzée    Pelé  Ferreri  Desailly ) / Marseille, Stade Vélodrome / Attendance: 35,000
PFC CSKA Moscow: Guteyev, Mamchur, Kolotovkin (captain), Bystrov, Malyukov, Antonovich, Minko, Mashkarin (Karsakov, 40), Sergeyev, Bushmanov (Grishin, 46), Faizulin.

 April 7, 1993 / Group A, Day 5 / PFC CSKA Moscow - Club Brugge (Belgium) 1-2 (Sergeyev  - Schaessens  Verheyen ) / Berlin, Olympic Stadium / Attendance: 2,500
PFC CSKA Moscow: Plotnikov, Guschin, Kolotovkin (captain), Mashkarin, Malyukov, Bushmanov, Minko, Karsakov (Mamchur, 70), Ivanov (Antonovich, 32), Faizulin, Sergeyev.

 April 21, 1993 / Group A, Day 6 / Rangers (Scotland) - PFC CSKA Moscow 0-0 / Glasgow, Ibrox Stadium / Attendance: 43,142
PFC CSKA Moscow: Plotnikov, Guschin, Mamchur, Mashkarin, Malyukov (captain), Bushmanov, Minko, Karsakov, Antonovich, Sergeyev, Faizulin (Dudnyk, 60).

1992–93 European Cup Winners' Cup
FC Spartak Moscow reached the semifinals, tying the best European result in club's history.

 March 2, 1993 / Quarterfinals, First Leg / Feyenoord (Netherlands - FC Spartak Moscow 0-1 (Piatnitski ) / Rotterdam, de Kuip / Attendance: 33,187
FC Spartak Moscow: Cherchesov (captain), Khlestov, Ivanov, Popov (Gashkin, 89), Beschastnykh, Chernyshov, Onopko, Karpin (Pisarev, 72), Piatnitski, Lediakhov, Radchenko.

 March 18, 1993 / Quarterfinals, Return Leg / FC Spartak Moscow - Feyenoord 3-1 (Karpin   Radchenko  Cherenkov   - Kiprich  van Gobbel ) / Moscow, Torpedo Stadium / Attendance: 15,000
FC Spartak Moscow: Cherchesov, Khlestov (Mamedov, 62), Ivanov, Popov, Bondar, Lediakhov, Onopko (captain), Karpin, Piatnitski, Cherenkov, Radchenko.

 April 7, 1993 / Semifinals, First Leg / FC Spartak Moscow - Royal Antwerp FC (Belgium) 1-0 (Piatnitski ) / Moscow, Luzhniki Stadium / Attendance: 75,000
FC Spartak Moscow: Cherchesov, Khlestov, Ivanov, Popov, Beschastnykh, Chernyshov, Mamedov, Karpin (captain), Piatnitski, Lediakhov, Radchenko (Pisarev, 57).

 April 22, 1993 / Semifinals, Return Leg / Royal Antwerp FC - FC Spartak Moscow 3-1 (Czerniatynski  Jakovljević  Lehnhoff  - Radchenko  Onopko ) / Antwerp, Bosuilstadion / Attendance: 27,000
FC Spartak Moscow: Cherchesov, Khlestov, Ivanov, Popov (Gashkin, 42), Pisarev, Chernyshov, Onopko (captain), Karpin, Piatnitski, Lediakhov, Radchenko (Baksheyev, 44).

1993–94 UEFA Champions League
FC Spartak Moscow qualified for the group stage and continued to play in the group into the 1994.

 September 15, 1993 / First Round, First Leg / Skonto FC (Latvia) - FC Spartak Moscow 0-5 (Pohodin  Rodionov    Beschastnykh ) / Riga, Daugava Stadium / Attendance: 2,900
FC Spartak Moscow: Staučė (Pomazun, 33), Khlestov, Mamedov, Tsymbalar, Rodionov, Nikiforov, Onopko (captain), Karpin, Pohodin, Lediakhov, Beschastnykh.

 September 29, 1993 / First Round, Return Leg / FC Spartak Moscow - Skonto FC 4-0 (Tsymbalar   Pisarev  Onopko ) / Moscow, Luzhniki Stadium / Attendance: 3,500
FC Spartak Moscow: Pomazun, Khlestov, Mamedov, Tsymbalar, Pisarev (Tikhonov, 70), Ananko, Onopko (captain), Karpin, Piatnitski, Rodionov, Beschastnykh (Lediakhov, 60).

 October 20, 1993 / Second Round, First Leg / Lech Poznań (Poland) - FC Spartak Moscow 1-5 (Podbrożny  - Pisarev   Karpin  Onopko  ) / Poznań, Miejski / Attendance: 12,000
FC Spartak Moscow: Pomazun, Khlestov, Mamedov, Tsymbalar, Pisarev, Nikiforov, Onopko (captain), Karpin, Ananko, Cherenkov (Lediakhov, 51), Beschastnykh (Tikhonov, 75).

 November 3, 1993 / Second Round, Return Leg / FC Spartak Moscow - Lech Poznań 2-1 (Karpin  Khlestov  - Dembiński ) / Moscow, Luzhniki Stadium / Attendance: 10,000
FC Spartak Moscow: Pomazun, Khlestov, Mamedov, Tsymbalar, Pisarev, Nikiforov, Onopko (captain), Karpin, Ananko (Cherenkov, 40), Lediakhov, Beschastnykh.

 November 24, 1993 / Group A, Day 1 / AS Monaco (France) - FC Spartak Moscow 4-1 (Klinsmann  Ikpeba  Djorkaeff  Thuram  - Pisarev ) / Monaco, Stade Louis II / Attendance: 20,000
FC Spartak Moscow: Pomazun, Khlestov, Ivanov, Tsymbalar, Pisarev, Nikiforov, Onopko (captain), Karpin, Mamedov, Lediakhov (Piatnitski, 46), Beschastnykh (Rodionov, 74).

 December 8, 1993 / Group A, Day 2 / FC Spartak Moscow - Galatasaray S.K. (Turkey) 0-0 (Mamedov  - Stumpf ) / Moscow, Luzhniki Stadium / Attendance: 50,000
FC Spartak Moscow: Pomazun, Khlestov (Ivanov, 33), Mamedov, Tsymbalar, Pisarev, Nikiforov, Onopko (captain), Karpin, Piatnitski, Lediakhov, Beschastnykh (Ananko, 58).

1993–94 UEFA Cup Winners' Cup
FC Torpedo Moscow went out in the first round.

 September 15, 1993 / First Round, First Leg / FC Torpedo Moscow - Maccabi Haifa (Israel) 1-0 (Borisov ) / Moscow, Torpedo Stadium / Attendance: 4,000
FC Torpedo Moscow: Podshivalov (captain), Kalaychev, Cheltsov, Afanasyev, Borisov, Chumachenko (Prokopenko, 79), Grishin, Filimonov (Ulyanov, 14), Talalayev, Chugainov, Pazemov.

 September 28, 1993 / First Round, Return Leg / Maccabi Haifa - FC Torpedo Moscow 3-1 (Mizrahi  Pets  Holtzman  - Kalaychev ) / Haifa, Kiryat Eliezer Stadium / Attendance: 9,000
FC Torpedo Moscow: Podshivalov (captain), Kalaychev (Savichev, 46), Cheltsov, Afanasyev, Ulyanov (Solovyov, 82), Shustikov, Grishin, Vostrosablin, Talalayev, Chugainov, Borisov.

1993–94 UEFA Cup
All three participating Russian teams drew very tough opponents in the first round and all were eliminated. FC Spartak Vladikavkaz and FC Lokomotiv Moscow played in Europe for the first time in their history.

 September 14, 1993 / First round, first leg / FC Dynamo Moscow – Eintracht Frankfurt (Germany) 0–6 (Gaudino  Weber  Furtok  Bein  Okocha  Yeboah ) / Moscow, Dynamo Stadium / Attendance: 14,000
FC Dynamo Moscow: Smetanin, Selezov, Kovtun, Smertin, Kalitvintsev, Chernyshov, Tedeyev, Cheryshev, Tetradze, Dobrovolski (captain), Rybakov (Nekrasov, 46).

 September 15, 1993 / First round, first leg / Borussia Dortmund (Germany) – FC Spartak Vladikavkaz 0–0 / Dortmund, Westfalenstadion / Attendance: 35,539
FC Spartak Vladikavkaz: Khapov, Pagayev, Denisov, Yanovskiy, Dzhioyev (captain), Alchagirov, Kostin (Saprykin, 90), Markhel (Isayev, 65), Dzoblayev, Suleymanov, Gazdanov.

 September 15, 1993 / First round, first leg / Juventus (Italy) – FC Lokomotiv Moscow 3–0 (Baggio   Ravanelli ) / Turin, Stadio delle Alpi / Attendance: 26,267
FC Lokomotiv Moscow: Ovchinnikov, Arifullin, Rakhimov, Podpaly (captain), Sabitov, Drozdov, Kosolapov, Alenichev, Samatov, Smirnov (Gorkov, 65), Petrov (Garin, 54).

 September 28, 1993 / First round, return leg / Eintracht Frankfurt – FC Dynamo Moscow 1–2 (Furtok  – Simutenkov  Dobrovolski ) / Frankfurt am Main, Waldstadion / Attendance: 4,900
FC Dynamo Moscow: Kleimyonov, Selezov, Krutov (Nekrasov, 71), Smertin, Kalitvintsev, Chernyshov, Tedeyev, Cheryshev (Savchenko, 86), Tetradze, Dobrovolski (captain), Simutenkov.

 September 28, 1993 / First round, return leg / FC Spartak Vladikavkaz – Borussia Dortmund 0–1 (Chapuisat  Kutowski ) / Vladikavkaz, Republican Spartak Stadium / Attendance: 33,000
FC Spartak Vladikavkaz: Khapov, Pagayev, Denisov, Yanovskiy, Dzhioyev (captain), Alchagirov, Kostin (Igor B. Kachmazov, 52), Markhel, Dzoblayev, Suleymanov, Gazdanov.

 September 28, 1993 / First round, return leg / FC Lokomotiv Moscow – Juventus 0–1 (Marocchi ) / Moscow, Lokomotiv Stadium / Attendance: 7,000
FC Lokomotiv Moscow: Ovchinnikov, Arifullin, Rakhimov, Podpaly (captain), Sabitov, Fuzailov (Gorkov, 59), Kosolapov, Alenichev, Samatov, Smirnov, Nikulkin.

National team
Russia national football team qualified for 1994 FIFA World Cup after coming second in the qualifying group behind the winners Greece. Pavel Sadyrin was the manager in 1993.

 February 13, 1993 / Friendly / United States - Russia 0-1 (Sergeyev ) / Orlando, Citrus Bowl / Attendance: 13,650
Russia: Cherchesov (captain), Khlestov, Chernyshov, Ivanov, Onopko, Lediakhov (Afanasyev, 58), Popov (Tedeyev, 33), Karpin, Beschastnykh, Sergeyev (Matveyev, 70), Radchenko.

 February 17, 1993 / Friendly / El Salvador - Russia 1-2 (Díaz Arce  - Onopko  Tedeyev  Radchenko ) / Pasadena, Rose Bowl / Attendance: 16,000
Russia: Ovchinnikov, Khlestov, Sklyarov, Ivanov, Afanasyev, Onopko (captain), Karpin (Sergeyev, 46), Lediakhov, Tedeyev, Beschastnykh (Matveyev, 78), Radchenko.

 February 21, 1993 / Friendly / United States - Russia 0-0 / Palo Alto, Stanford Stadium / Attendance: 26,450.
Russia: Cherchesov (captain), Khlestov, Chernyshov, Ivanov, Onopko, Lediakhov, Karpin, Popov (Tedeyev, 46), Beschastnykh (Matveyev, 46), Sergeyev, Radchenko.

 March 24, 1993 / Friendly / Israel - Russia 2-2 (Mizrahi   - Popov   Kiriakov  Onopko ) / Haifa, Kiryat Eliezer Stadium / Attendance: 3,000
Russia: Cherchesov, Kuznetsov, Gorlukovich, Mokh, Ivanov, Kulkov, Onopko  (captain), Karpin, Korneev, Radchenko (Popov, 46), Kiriakov.

 April 14, 1993 / 1994 FIFA World Cup qualifier / Luxembourg - Russia 0-4 (Kiriakov   Shalimov  Kulkov ) / Luxembourg, Stade Josy Barthel / Attendance: 3,200
Russia: Cherchesov, Gorlukovich, Ivanov, Onopko, Kanchelskis, Shalimov (captain), Dobrovolski, Korneev (Kulkov, 66), Kolyvanov, Yuran, Kiriakov (Popov, 77).

 April 28, 1993 / 1994 FIFA World Cup qualifier / Russia - Hungary 3-0 (Kanchelskis  Kolyvanov  Yuran ) / Moscow, Luzhniki Stadium / Attendance: 25,000
Russia: Kharine, Onopko, Ivanov, Gorlukovich, Kanchelskis, Shalimov (captain), Dobrovolski, Korneev (Kulkov, 56), Kolyvanov, Yuran, Kiriakov (Mostovoi, 74).

 May 23, 1993 / 1994 FIFA World Cup qualifier / Russia - Greece 1-1 (Dobrovolski  - Mitropoulos ) / Moscow, Luzhniki Stadium / Attendance: 45,000
Russia: Kharine, Gorlukovich, Onopko, Ivanov, Kanchelskis, Shalimov (captain), Dobrovolski, Kulkov (Tatarchuk, 65), Kolyvanov, Yuran, Kiriakov.

 June 2, 1993 / 1994 FIFA World Cup qualifier / Iceland - Russia 1-1 (Sverrisson  - Kiriakov ) / Reykjavík, Laugardalsvöllur / Attendance: 12,500
Russia: Kharine, Gorlukovich, Onopko (captain), Ivanov, Kanchelskis, Tatarchuk (Korneev, 68), Dobrovolski, Kulkov, Kolyvanov, Yuran (Lediakhov, 75), Kiriakov.

 July 28, 1993 / Friendly / France - Russia 3-1 (Sauzée  Cantona  Papin  - Blanc ) / Caen, Stade Michel d'Ornano / Attendance: 22,000
Russia: Cherchesov, Khlestov (Popov, 46), Onopko (captain), Ivanov, Kanchelskis, Gorlukovich, Lediakhov, Karpin (Tetradze, 70), Piatnitski, Yuran, Radchenko (Faizulin, 65).

 September 8, 1993 / 1994 FIFA World Cup qualifier / Hungary - Russia 1-3 (Nikiforov  - Piatnitski  Kiriakov  Borodyuk ) / Budapest, Stadion Üllői Út / Attendance: 15,000
Russia: Kharine, Gorlukovich, Onopko, Ivanov, Kanchelskis, Shalimov (captain), Piatnitski (Dobrovolski, 70), Nikiforov, Kolyvanov, Yuran (Borodyuk, 55), Kiriakov.

 October 6, 1993 / Friendly / Saudi Arabia - Russia 4-2 (Al-Muwallid  Galiamin  Idris  Al-Mehallel  - Mostovoi  ) / Dammam, Prince Mohamed bin Fahd Stadium / Attendance: 20,000
Russia: Ovchinnikov (Podshivalov, 63), Galiamin, Onopko (captain), Kulkov, Khlestov, Karpin (Kosolapov, 63), Piatnitski, Tetradze, Mostovoi, Yuran, Beschastnykh (Tedeyev, 63).

 November 17, 1993 / 1994 FIFA World Cup qualifier / Greece - Russia 1-0 (Machlas ) / Athens, Olympic Stadium / Attendance: 70,000
Russia: Cherchesov, Khlestov, Onopko, Nikiforov, Kulkov, Shalimov (captain), Dobrovolski, Popov (Mostovoi, 82), Kolyvanov, Yuran (Salenko, 46), Kiriakov.

References

 
Seasons in Russian football